The Men's team pursuit was held on 14-15 October 2015.

Results

Qualifying
The fastest 8 teams qualify for the first round, from which the top 4 remain in contention for the gold medal final and the other 4 for the bronze medal final.

 Q = qualified; in contention for gold medal final
 q = qualified; in contention for bronze medal final

First round
First round heats are held as follows:
Heat 1: 6th v 7th qualifier
Heat 2: 5th v 8th qualifier
Heat 3: 2nd v 3rd qualifier
Heat 4: 1st v 4th qualifier

The winners of heats 3 and 4 proceed to the gold medal final.
The remaining 6 teams are ranked on time, then proceed to the finals for bronze, 5th or 7th place.

 QG = qualified for gold medal final
 QB = qualified for bronze medal final
 Q5 = qualified for 5th place final
 Q7 = qualified for 7th place final

Finals
The final classification is determined in the ranking finals.

References

Men's team pursuit
European Track Championships – Men's team pursuit